Frydrychowo  is a village in the administrative district of Gmina Wąbrzeźno, within Wąbrzeźno County, Kuyavian-Pomeranian Voivodeship, in north-central Poland.

The village has a population of 80.

References

Villages in Wąbrzeźno County